The Czechoslovak Player of the Year award was an annual prize given to the best Czechoslovak football player by the Czechoslovak Football Association since 1965. Award for coach of the year was also awarded since 1985.

Winners

References 
 Historie ankety Fotbalista roku at ČMFS website

Association football player of the year awards by nationality
    
Awards established in 1965
1965 establishments in Czechoslovakia
1992 disestablishments in Czechoslovakia
Annual events in Czechoslovakia
Awards disestablished in 1992
Association football player non-biographical articles